Hoffman Hotel is a historic hotel building located at South Bend, St. Joseph County, Indiana. It was built in 1930, and is a 12-story, red brick building with limestone trim and terra cotta mosaic tile panels in an eclectic style. It originally housed 21 small apartments and 150 hotel rooms.  It is located next to the LaSalle Hotel.

It was listed on the National Register of Historic Places in 1985.

References

External links

Hotel buildings on the National Register of Historic Places in Indiana
Hotel buildings completed in 1930
Buildings and structures in South Bend, Indiana
National Register of Historic Places in St. Joseph County, Indiana